Grahame Laughlan Jarratt (10 January 1929 – 5 August 2011) was a New Zealand rower.

At the 1950 British Empire Games he won the silver medal as part of the men's eight alongside crew members Donald Adam, Kerry Ashby, Murray Ashby, Bruce Culpan, Thomas Engel, Don Rowlands, Edwin Smith and Bill Tinnock.

References

1929 births
2011 deaths
New Zealand male rowers
Rowers at the 1950 British Empire Games
Commonwealth Games silver medallists for New Zealand
Commonwealth Games medallists in rowing
Medallists at the 1950 British Empire Games